Southern Freeez may refer to:
 Southern Freeez (album), an album by jazz-funk band Freeez
 "Southern Freeez" (song), a song by Freeez from the album